Dysschema rorata is a moth of the family Erebidae. It was described by Francis Walker in 1865. It is found in Colombia.

References

Dysschema
Moths described in 1865